

Subfamily Riodininae: metalmarks

 Little metalmark, Calephelis virginiensis
 Northern metalmark, Calephelis borealis
 Fatal metalmark, Calephelis nemesis
 Rounded metalmark, Calephelis perditalis
 Wright's metalmark, Calephelis wrighti
 Swamp metalmark, Calephelis mutica
 Rawson's metalmark, Calephelis rawsoni
 Rawson's Rawson's metalmark, Calephelis rawsoni rawsoni
 Freeman's Rawson's metalmark, Calephelis rawsoni freemani
 Arizona metalmark, Calephelis arizonensis
 Red-bordered metalmark, Caria ino
 Blue metalmark, Lasaia sula
 Black-patched bluemark, Lasaia agesilas
 Gray bluemark, Lasaia maria
 Red-bordered pixie, Melanis pixe
 Common jewelmark, Sarota chrysus
 Carousing jewelmark, Anteros carausius
 Zela metalmark, Emesis zela
 Ares metalmark, Emesis ares
 Veracruz tanmark, Emesis vulpina
 Curve-winged metalmark, Emesis emesia
 Falcate metalmark, Emesis tenedia
 Mormon metalmark, Apodemia mormo
 Apodemia mormo virgulti
 Apodemia mormo mejicanus
 Apodemia mormo duryi
 Lange's Mormon metalmark, Apodemia mormo langei
 Narrow-winged metalmark, Apodemia multiplaga
 Hepburn's metalmark, Apodemia hepburni
 Palmer's metalmark, Apodemia palmeri
 Walker's metalmark, Apodemia walkeri
 Crescent metalmark, Apodemia phyciodoides
 Nais metalmark, Apodemia nais
 Nais nais metalmark, Apodemia nais nais
 Chisos nais metalmark, Apodemia nais chisosensis
 Sealpoint metalmark, Apodemia hypoglauca

References
Jim P. Brock, Kenn Kaufman (2003). Butterflies of North America. Boston: Houghton Mifflin. .

North America
Riodinidae